Stephen Rowe may refer to:

Stephen Rowe (footballer) (born 1965), Australian rules footballer
Stephen Rowe (poet) (born 1980), Canadian poet
Stephen Rowe (musician), Australian country singer

See also
Steve Rowe (born 1965), Australian musician
Steve Rowe (businessman), British businessman, CEO of Marks & Spencer
G. Steven Rowe, American politician